Brad Davis (born February 17, 1980) is an American football coach who is currently the offensive line coach at Louisiana State University.

Playing career 
Davis played his high school football at Belaire High School and later went on to the Oklahoma. Playing from 1999 until 2002 he was a part of multiple Big 12 championship teams and the 2000 national championship team as a part of the offensive line.

Coaching career

Early coaching career
After he graduated from Oklahoma, Davis began coaching at the high school level working as the offensive line and was co-offensive coordinator at Southern Lab in Baton Rouge. He then spent the beginning of 2005 at Wayne State as a graduate assistant before going to work at Doane College as the offensive line coach and run game coordinator. He then went back to being a graduate assistant this time at Texas A&M for the 2006 and 2007 seasons before going to North Carolina to be a graduate assistant in 2008.

Portland State
He then went to Portland State where he spent five years as the offensive line coach and two as the run game coordinator.  During his tenure there the Vikings set numerous school records including total yards (6,486) and yards rushing (3,330), rushing yards per game (277.7), rushing touchdowns (36) and total yards per game (540.5).

James Madison
In 2014 Davis went to JMU to work as the co-offensive coordinator and offensive line coach.

East Carolina

In 2015, Davis served as the run game coordinator and offensive line coach at East Carolina University.

North Texas
In 2016, Davis worked as the run game coordinator and offensive line coach for North Texas.

Florida
In 2017 Davis ventured into the SEC and worked as the offensive line coach for the Florida Gators.

Missouri
In 2018 and 2019, Davis worked as the offensive line coach for Missouri under Barry Odom.

Arkansas
In 2020 Davis was a part of Sam Pittman’s inaugural staff as the offensive line coach for Arkansas.

LSU
In 2021, the Louisiana native was named the offensive line coach for LSU. Following the final regular season game, Ed Orgeron named Davis the interim head coach. Davis coached LSU in the Texas Bowl. He was retained by Brian Kelly for the 2022 season.

Personal life 
Davis and his wife, Anecia, have two sons, Bradley and Brayden.

Head coaching record

College

*Coached bowl game after Ed Orgeron stepped down

References

External links
 LSU profile

1980 births
Living people
American football offensive guards
Arkansas Razorbacks football coaches
Doane Tigers football coaches
East Carolina Pirates football coaches
Florida Gators football coaches
James Madison Dukes football coaches
LSU Tigers football coaches
Missouri Tigers football coaches
North Carolina Tar Heels football coaches
North Texas Mean Green football coaches
Oklahoma Sooners football players
Portland State Vikings football coaches
Texas A&M Aggies football coaches
Wayne State Warriors football coaches
High school football coaches in Louisiana
Coaches of American football from Louisiana
Players of American football from Baton Rouge, Louisiana